Japan competed at the 2016 Summer Olympics in Rio de Janeiro, Brazil, from 5 to 21 August 2016. Since the nation's official debut in 1912, Japanese athletes had appeared at every Summer Olympic Games in the modern era, except for two editions; they were not invited to the 1948 Summer Olympics in London because of the nation's role in World War II, and were also part of the United States-led boycott, when Moscow hosted the 1980 Summer Olympics.

As Tokyo was the host city of the 2020 Summer Olympics, a Japanese segment was performed during the closing ceremony. The Olympic flag was handed to Yuriko Koike, the Governor of Tokyo from Mayor of Rio de Janeiro, Eduardo Paes, who passed it to IOC President Thomas Bach before handed it to her. Prime Minister Shinzo Abe was present in the ceremony, dressed as Nintendo's Mario character. He travelled underground from Tokyo to Rio using the tunnel that was created in animation by both Nintendo and the Japanese Olympic Committee.

Medalists

The following Japanese competitors won medals at the Games. In the by discipline sections below, medalists' names are bolded.

|  style="text-align:left; width:78%; vertical-align:top;"|

|  style="text-align:left; width:22%; vertical-align:top;"|

Competitors

| width=78% align=left valign=top |
The following is the list of number of competitors participating in the Games. Note that reserves in fencing, field hockey, football, and handball are not counted as athletes:

Archery

Three Japanese archers qualified for the women's events after having secured a top eight finish in the team recurve at the 2015 World Archery Championships in Copenhagen, Denmark. Another Japanese archer also qualified for the men's individual recurve by obtaining one of the eight Olympic places available from the same tournament.

Athletics

Japanese athletes have so far achieved qualifying standards in the following athletics events (up to a maximum of 3 athletes in each event): The team was selected based on the results of the 2016 Japan Championships in Athletics, and once an athlete wins a medal in race walking and marathon, or attains the top eight position in track and field at the 2015 IAAF World Championships in Beijing, China.

On March 17, 2016, the Japan Association of Athletics Federations (JAAF) had selected three runners each in both men's and women's marathon race, with Kayoko Fukushi remarkably going to her fourth consecutive Olympics. Forty-two further athletes (31 men and 11 women) were added to the nation's track and field roster for the Games, based on their performances achieved at the Japan Championships (June 24 to 26). Among them were sprinters Chisato Fukushima and Shota Iizuka, 2015 Worlds bronze medalist and three-time Olympic race walker Takayuki Tanii, and javelin thrower Ryohei Arai.

Track & road events
Men

Women

Field events
Men

Women

Combined events – Men's decathlon

Badminton

Japan has qualified a total of nine badminton players for each of the following events into the Olympic tournament based on the BWF World Rankings as of 5 May 2016: two entries in the women's singles, one in the men's singles, and a pair each in the men's, women's, and mixed doubles.

Men

Women

Mixed

Basketball

Women's tournament

Japan women's basketball team qualified for the Olympics by winning the gold medal match over China and securing the lone outright berth at the 2015 FIBA Asia Championships.

Team roster

Group play

Quarterfinal

Boxing

Japan has entered two boxers to compete in each of the following classes into the Olympic boxing tournament. Daisuke Narimatsu had claimed his Olympic spot with a box-off victory in the men's lightweight division at the 2016 Asia & Oceania Qualification Tournament in Qian'an, China, while bantamweight boxer Arashi Morisaka secured an additional place on the Japanese roster with his quarterfinal triumph at the 2016 AIBA World Qualifying Tournament in Baku, Azerbaijan.

Canoeing

Slalom
Japanese canoeists have qualified a maximum of one boat in each of the following classes through the 2015 ICF Canoe Slalom World Championships and the 2016 Asian Championships.

Cycling

Road
Japanese riders qualified for a maximum of two quota places in the men's Olympic road race by virtue of their top 4 national ranking in the 2015 UCI Asia Tour. One additional spot was awarded to the Japanese cyclist in the women's road race by virtue of her top 100 individual placement in the 2016 UCI World Rankings.

Track
Following the completion of the 2016 UCI Track Cycling World Championships, Japanese riders have accumulated spots in the men's sprint and men's keirin, as well as both the men's and women's omnium, by virtue of their final individual UCI Olympic rankings in those events. The track cycling team was named to the Olympic roster on April 6, 2016.

Sprint

Keirin

Omnium

Mountain biking
Japan has qualified one mountain biker for the men's Olympic cross-country race, as a result of his nation's twenty-third-place finish in the UCI Olympic Ranking List of May 25, 2016. London 2012 Olympian Kohei Yamamoto was named to the Olympic roster on June 9, 2016.

BMX
Japanese riders qualified for one men's quota place in BMX at the Olympics, as a result of the nation's thirteenth-place finish in the UCI Olympic Ranking List of May 31, 2016, signifying the nation's return to the sport after an eight-year hiatus. Japan's top-ranked BMX rider Yoshitaku Nagasako was named to the Olympic roster on June 9, 2016.

Diving

Japanese divers qualified for four individual spots at the Olympics through the 2015 FINA World Championships and the 2016 FINA World Cup series. Japanese Olympic Committee (JOC) announced the Olympic diving team on April 11, 2016.

Equestrian

Japan has fielded a full squad of four equestrian riders each into the Olympic team jumping and dressage competition by obtaining a top finish each at the FEI qualification event for East Asia and Oceania in Hagen and Perl, Germany, respectively. Two eventing riders have been added to the squad by virtue of the following results in the individual FEI Olympic rankings: a top finish from Asia & Oceania, and a top two finish from the combined group of Africa, Middle East, Asia, and Oceania.

Dressage
Japanese Olympic selection trials were held on June 1–2, 2016 in Hagen, Germany, after which the final team was named.

Eventing

Jumping

"TO" indicates that the rider only qualified for the team competition. "#" indicates that the score of this rider does not count in the team competition, since only the best three results of a team are counted.

Fencing

Following the completion of the Grand Prix finals, Japan has entered four fencers into the Olympic competition. Kazuyasu Minobe, Chika Aoki, London 2012 Olympian Nozomi Sato (née Nakano), and Beijing 2008 silver medalist and 2015 World men's foil champion Yuki Ota had claimed their Olympic spots as one of the two highest-ranked fencers coming from the Asian zone in the FIE Adjusted Official Rankings. Kenta Tokunan and 2012 Olympian Shiho Nishioka rounded out the Japanese roster to six by virtue of a top three finish at the Asian Zonal Qualifier in Wuxi, China.

Field hockey

Summary

Women's tournament

Japan women's field hockey team qualified for the Olympics by having achieved the next highest placement in the 2014–2015 FIH Hockey World League Semifinals, among the countries that have not qualified yet for the Games.

Team roster

Group play

Football

Summary

Men's tournament

Japan men's football team qualified for the Olympics by virtue of a top two finish at and by progressing to the gold medal match of the 2016 AFC U-23 Championship in Qatar.

Team roster

Group play

Golf 

Japan has entered four golfers (two per gender) into the Olympic tournament. Yuta Ikeda (world no. 93), Shingo Katayama (world no. 107), Haru Nomura (world no. 22) and Shiho Oyama (world no. 43) qualified directly among the top 60 eligible players for their respective individual events based on the IGF World Rankings as of 11 July 2016.

Gymnastics

Artistic
Japan fielded a full squad of five gymnasts in both the men's and women's artistic gymnastics events through a top eight finish each in the team all-around at the 2015 World Artistic Gymnastics Championships in Glasgow. The men's and women's gymnastics squads, led by London 2012 individual all-around champion Kōhei Uchimura, were named to the Olympic roster at the conclusion of the All-Japan Championships (for men) and NHK Trophy (for women) in Tokyo on June 5, 2016.

Men
Team

Individual finals

Women
Team

Individual finals

Rhythmic 
Japan has qualified a squad of rhythmic gymnasts for the individual and group all-around by finishing in the top 15 (for individual) and top 10 (for group) at the 2015 World Championships in Stuttgart, Germany.

Trampoline
Japan has qualified two gymnasts in the men's trampoline by virtue of a top eight finish at the 2015 World Championships in Odense, Denmark. Meanwhile, an additional Olympic berth had been awarded to the Japanese female gymnast, who finished in the top six at the 2016 Olympic Test Event in Rio de Janeiro.

Judo

Japan has qualified a full squad of 14 judokas (seven men and seven women) for each of the following weight classes at the Games by virtue of their top 22 national finish for men and top 14 for women in the IJF World Ranking List of May 30, 2016. Twelve members of the judo team, highlighted by London 2012 champion Kaori Matsumoto and bronze medalist Masashi Ebinuma, were named to the Olympic roster at the All-Japan Championships on April 3, 2016, while the heavyweight judokas rounded out the selection at the end of IJF World Masters in Guadalajara, Mexico.

Men

Women

Modern pentathlon

Japan has qualified a total of three modern pentathletes for the following events at the Games. Natsumi Tomonaga finished among the top five in the women's modern pentathlon, while Tomoya Miguchi and Shōhei Iwamoto received spare Olympic berths freed up by China and South Korea, as the highest-ranked eligible individuals, not yet qualified, in the men's event at the 2015 Asia & Oceania Championships.

Rowing

Japan has qualified one boat each in the men's and women's lightweight double sculls, respectively, for the Olympics at the 2016 Asia & Oceania Continental Qualification Regatta in Chungju, South Korea.

Qualification Legend: FA=Final A (medal); FB=Final B (non-medal); FC=Final C (non-medal); FD=Final D (non-medal); FE=Final E (non-medal); FF=Final F (non-medal); SA/B=Semifinals A/B; SC/D=Semifinals C/D; SE/F=Semifinals E/F; QF=Quarterfinals; R=Repechage

Rugby sevens

Men's tournament

Japan men's rugby sevens team qualified for the Olympics by winning the 2015 ARFU Men's Sevens Championships in Hong Kong.

Team roster

Group play

Quarterfinal

Semifinal

Bronze medal match

Women's tournament

Japan women's rugby sevens team qualified for the Olympics by winning the 2015 ARFU Women's Sevens Championships in Hong Kong and Japan.

Team roster

Group play

Classification semifinal (9–12)

Ninth place match

Sailing

Japanese sailors have qualified one boat in each of the following classes through the 2014 ISAF Sailing World Championships, the individual fleet Worlds, and Asian qualifying regattas.

A total of eleven Japanese sailors were officially named to the Olympic team on July 1, 2016, with windsurfer Makoto Tomizawa and skiff yachtsman Yukio Makino racing through the Rio regatta at their third straight Games.

Men

Women

M = Medal race; EL = Eliminated – did not advance into the medal race

Shooting

Japanese shooters have achieved quota places for the following events by virtue of their best finishes at the 2015 ISSF World Cup series, World Shotgun Championships, and Asian Championships, as long as they obtained a minimum qualifying score (MQS) by March 31, 2016.

In December 2015, the Japanese Olympic Committee had officially announced the names of three shooters to compete at the Games. The remaining Japanese shooters (Akiyama, Ishihara, Mori, Okada, and Sato) had claimed their Olympic spots at the Asian Qualification Tournament in New Delhi, India to round out the team selection.

Men

Women

Qualification Legend: Q = Qualify for the next round; q = Qualify for the bronze medal (shotgun)

Swimming

Japanese swimmers have so far achieved qualifying standards in the following events (up to a maximum of 2 swimmers in each event at the Olympic Qualifying Time (OQT), and potentially 1 at the Olympic Selection Time (OST)): They must finish in the top two of each individual pool event under both the federation's required standard and an Olympic Qualifying Time at the 2016 Japan Open Swim Trials (April 4 to 10 in Tokyo) to assure their selection to the Olympic team.

A total of 34 swimmers (17 per gender) had been selected to the Japanese roster for the Olympics, the second largest in history. Among them were London 2012 medalists Kosuke Hagino and Ryosuke Irie, 2015 World champions Daiya Seto, Natsumi Hoshi and Kanako Watanabe, Olympic veterans Takeshi Matsuda and Takuro Fujii, and rising teen Rikako Ikee.

Men

Women

Synchronized swimming

Japan has fielded a squad of nine synchronized swimmers to compete in both the women's team and duet routine by virtue of their second-place finish at the FINA Olympic test event in Rio de Janeiro.

Table tennis

Japan has fielded a team of six athletes into the table tennis competition at the Games. Jun Mizutani, Koki Niwa, and London 2012 silver medalists Ai Fukuhara and Kasumi Ishikawa were automatically selected among the top 22 eligible players each in their respective singles events based on the ITTF Olympic Rankings.

Maharu Yoshimura and Mima Ito were each awarded the third spot to build the men's and women's teams for the Games by virtue of a top 10 national finish in the ITTF Olympic Rankings.

Men

Women

Taekwondo

Japan entered one athlete into the taekwondo competition at the Olympics. 2012 Olympian Mayu Hamada qualified automatically for the women's lightweight category (57 kg) by finishing in the top 6 WTF Olympic rankings.

Tennis

Japan has entered two tennis players into the Olympic tournament. Asia's tennis star and London 2012 quarterfinalist Kei Nishikori (world no. 6), along with Misaki Doi (world no. 48) and Nao Hibino (world no. 69), qualified directly among the top 56 eligible players for their respective singles events based on the ATP and WTA World Rankings as of June 6, 2016. Having been directly entered to the singles, Doi also opted to play with her rookie partner Eri Hozumi in the women's doubles. Following the withdrawal of several tennis players from the Games, Yūichi Sugita (world no. 106) and Taro Daniel (world no. 108) received a spare ITF Olympic places to join Nishikori in the men's singles.

Triathlon

Japan has qualified a total of four triathletes for the following events at the Games. Incoming four-time Olympian Hirokatsu Tayama and Ai Ueda secured their Olympic spots in the men's and women's triathlon, respectively, as a result of their gold medal triumph at the 2016 Asian Championships in Hatsukaichi. Meanwhile, Ueda's teammates Yurie Kato and 2010 Youth Olympic gold medalist Yuka Sato were ranked among the top 40 eligible triathletes in the women's event based on the ITU Olympic Qualification List as of May 15, 2016.

Volleyball

Indoor

Women's tournament

Japan women's volleyball team qualified for the Olympics by picking up the continental spot as the highest-ranked Asian team at the first meet of the World Olympic Qualifying Tournament in Tokyo.

Team roster

Group play

Quarterfinal

Water polo

Summary

Men's tournament

Japan men's water polo team qualified for the Olympics by winning the gold medal and securing a lone outright berth at the Asian Championships in Foshan, China, signifying the nation's Olympic comeback to the men's tournament for the first time since 1984.

Team roster

Group play

Weightlifting

Japanese weightlifters have qualified three men's and four women's quota places for the Rio Olympics based on their combined team standing by points at the 2014 and 2015 IWF World Championships. The team must allocate these places to individual athletes by June 20, 2016.

The weightlifting team was named to the Olympic roster on May 28, 2016, with London 2012 silver medalist Hiromi Miyake remarkably going to her fourth straight Games. Two further places were added to the Japanese weightlifting squad, as a response to Azerbaijan's omission from the ranking list published at the World Championships, due to "multiple positive cases" of doping on the nation's weightlifters.

Men

Women

Wrestling

Japan has qualified a total of ten wrestlers for each of the following weight classes into the Olympic competition. Majority of Olympic berths were awarded to Japanese female wrestlers, who finished among the top six at the 2015 World Championships, while five more had booked their Olympic spots by progressing to the top two finals at the 2016 Asian Qualification Tournament.

Men's freestyle

Men's Greco-Roman

Women's freestyle

See also
Japan at the 2016 Summer Paralympics

References

External links 

 

Nations at the 2016 Summer Olympics
2016
2016 in Japanese sport